"Trouble-Maker" is a 1976 single by disco/gospel singer, Roberta Kelly. The single, written and produced by Giorgio Moroder and  Pete Bellotte, was a number-one hit on the disco chart for two weeks.  "Trouble Maker" failed to reach either the pop or soul charts.

References

1976 singles
1976 songs
Disco songs
Song recordings produced by Giorgio Moroder
Song recordings produced by Pete Bellotte
Songs written by Giorgio Moroder
Songs written by Pete Bellotte